Scorpiops luridus is a species of scorpion in the Euscorpiidae family, first found in Tibet and Yunnan, China.

References

Further reading
Jiao, Guo B., and M. S. Zhu. "Courtship and mating of Scorpiops luridus Zhu Lourenço & Qi, 2005 (Scorpiones: Euscorpiidae) from Xizang province, China." Journal of Venomous Animals and Toxins including Tropical Diseases 16.1 (2010): 155-165.
Di, Zhiyong, et al. "Notes on the scorpions (Arachnida, Scorpiones) from Xizang with the redescription of Scorpiops jendeki Kovařík, 2000 (Scorpiones, Euscorpiidae) from Yunnan (China)." ZooKeys 301 (2013): 51.

External links

Euscorpiidae
Scorpions of Asia
Animals described in 2005